Maksymów may refer to the following places:
Maksymów, Radomsko County in Łódź Voivodeship (central Poland)
Maksymów, Tomaszów Mazowiecki County in Łódź Voivodeship (central Poland)
Maksymów, Wieruszów County in Łódź Voivodeship (central Poland)
Maksymów, Świętokrzyskie Voivodeship (south-central Poland)